Dieter Dieckhoff (30 April 1929 – 14 October 2022) was a German farmer and politician. A member of the Christian Democratic Union, he served in the Landtag of Lower Saxony from 1974 to 1990.

Dieckhoff died on 14 October 2022 at the age of 93.

References

1929 births
2022 deaths
German farmers
Christian Democratic Union of Germany politicians
Members of the Landtag of Lower Saxony
Politicians from Bremen